This is a list of notable French restaurants. French cuisine consists of cooking traditions and practices from France, famous for the rich tastes and subtle nuances with long and rich history. France, a country famous for its agriculture and independently minded peasants, was long a creative powerbase for delicious recipes, that are both healthy and refined. Knowledge of French cooking has contributed significantly to Western cuisines and its criteria are used widely in Western cookery school boards and culinary education. In November 2010, French gastronomy was added by the UNESCO to its lists of the world's "intangible cultural heritage".

French restaurants

 Alain Ducasse at the Dorchester
 Alex
 Les Amis
 An Xuyên Bakery
 Aviary, Portland, Oregon
 L'Arpège
 Atelier Crenn
 L'Atelier de Joël Robuchon
 L'Atelier de Joël Robuchon (Bangkok)
 L'Atelier de Joël Robuchon (London)
 Aubergine
 Bagatelle restaurant
 Balthazar
 Baumé Restaurant
 Beast, Portland, Oregon
 Le Bec-Fin
 Le Bernardin
 Berowra Waters Inn
 Bistro 990
 Bistro Agnes
 Bistro Moncur
 Bouchon
 Bouley
 Brasserie Julien
 Brasserie Montmartre, Portland, Oregon, U.S.
 Broussard's
 Café Boulud
 Cafe Campagne, Seattle
 Cafe Chambord
 Café des Artistes
 Café des Artistes (Puerto Vallarta), Mexico
 Cafe Nell, Portland, Oregon, U.S.
 Café Rouge
 Café Royal
 Canard, Portland, Oregon, U.S.
 Caprice
 Carlyle Restaurant
 Alain Chapel
 Chez Bruce
 Chez Dominique
 Chez Paul
 Le Cirque
 Coquine, Portland, Oregon, U.S.
 Corton
 La Côte Basque
 L'Entrecôte
 L'Espalier
 L'Express
 Les Créations de Narisawa
 Daniel
 Eleven Madison Park
 L'Escargot (restaurant)
 Everest
 Fenouil, Portland, Oregon, U.S.
 La Ferme de Mon Père
 Fleur de Lys
 Fouquet's
 Frog & Snail, Portland, Oregon, U.S.
 Gaddi's
 Galatoire's
 Galvin at Windows
 Knife Pleat
 Le Happy, Portland, Oregon, U.S.
 Le Gavroche
 La Grenouille
 Jean-Georges
 Jeune et Jolie
 Joël Robuchon, Las Vegas, Nevada, U.S.
 Little Bird Bistro, Portland, Oregon, U.S.
 Locke-Ober
 Lumière
 Lutèce
 Lutèce, Las Vegas, Nevada, U.S.
 La Madeleine
 Maison Novelli
 Le Manoir aux Quat' Saisons
 Mas
 Masa's Wine Bar & Kitchen
 Maurice, Portland, Oregon, U.S.
 Maxim's Paris
 Mimi's Cafe
 Mr & Mrs Bund, Shanghai, China
 One If By Land, Two If By Sea Restaurant
 L'Opéra restaurant
 Le Panier, Seattle
 Le Papillon
 La Parisienne French Bakery, Seattle
 Pâtisserie
 Le Pavillon
 Per Se
 Philippe's
 Le Pichet, Seattle
 Pied à Terre
 Pierre
 Le Pigeon, Portland, Oregon, U.S.
 Red Cow, Seattle, Washington, U.S.
 Restaurant André
 The Restaurant Marco Pierre White
 Rhubarb Le Restaurant
 RIA
 Roussillon
 Seinpost
 Sketch
 St. Jack, Portland, Oregon, U.S.
 St. Lawrence
 La Société
 La Tante Claire
 Tom Aikens
 Trois Mec
 Tru

See also

 Brasserie
 Friterie
 Haute cuisine
 List of French dishes
 List of French cheeses
 List of French desserts
 Lists of restaurants

References

 
French restaurants
Lists of ethnic restaurants